David von Ballmoos (born 30 December 1994) is a Swiss professional footballer who plays as a goalkeeper for Swiss Super League club Young Boys.

Club career
Von Ballmoss has been part of the Young Boys team since he joined in 2007 as part of their youth team. He was promoted into the main team in 2015 and sent on loan to FC Winterthur in Swiss Challenge League  for the  2015–16 and 2016–17 seasons. He has been back at BSC Young Boys since the 2017–18 season and now plays as the main  goalkeeper in the Super League. Von Balmoos made his professional debut for Young Boys in a Swiss Super League 2–0 win over Basel on 22 July 2017.

International career
Von Ballmoos is a two-time international for the Switzerland U20s.

He was called up to the senior Switzerland squad in November 2020.

Career statistics

Club

Honours 
Young Boys
 Swiss Super League: 2017–18, 2018–19, 2019–20
 Swiss Cup: 2019–20

References

External links
 Young Boys Official Profile
 
 SFL Profile
 

1994 births
Living people
Association football goalkeepers
Swiss men's footballers
Switzerland youth international footballers
Swiss Super League players
Swiss Challenge League players
BSC Young Boys players
FC Winterthur players
Sportspeople from the canton of Bern